She's Dangerous is a 1937 American crime film directed by Milton Carruth and Lewis R. Foster and written by Lionel Houser and Albert R. Perkins. The film stars Tala Birell, Walter Pidgeon, Cesar Romero, Walter Brennan, Warren Hymer, and Samuel S. Hinds. The film was released on January 24, 1937, by Universal Pictures.

Plot

Cast

References

External links
 

1937 films
American crime films
1937 crime films
Universal Pictures films
Films directed by Lewis R. Foster
Films directed by Milton Carruth
American black-and-white films
1930s English-language films
1930s American films